Bogatyńskie  is a village in the administrative district of Gmina Orneta, within Lidzbark County, Warmian-Masurian Voivodeship, in northern Poland.

The village Tungen in Prussia is where the Old Prussian family of Nicolaus von Tüngen (or Tungen), bishop of Warmia from 1467 until 1489, came from. In 1347, ancestors of von Tüngen, the Prussian Fürstbischof vom Ermland (Prince-Bishop of Warmia), the brothers Gunthe, Namir, Warpune and Sander were recorded.

References

External links
 A German website

Villages in Lidzbark County